Mala'efo'ou, formerly Mua, is a village in Wallis and Futuna. It is located in Mua District on the southeast coast of Wallis Island.

Overview
Mala'efo'ou is the main town in the district, located about 8 km south of Mata-Utu. Its population according to the 2018 census was 171 people. Except a few industrial buildings the village is residential.

Near the village there are two archaeological sites Talietumu and Tonga Toto and north of the center is also the church L'église Saint-Joseph, the oldest church in Wallis.

References

Populated places in Wallis and Futuna